Ballyhegan Davitts GAA Club (also "Ballyhegan Davitts Cumann Luthchleas Gael") is a Gaelic Athletic Association club located in central County Armagh, Northern Ireland. It is affiliated with the Armagh GAA and is based in the parish of Kilmore which has two ends: Mullavilly and Stonebridge. It currently competes in football, at under 7, 9, 11, 13, 15, 17 and 19 levels, and its senior team competes in the Armagh Intermediate Football Championship and in the Intermediate Division of the All-County League. The club is named after the Irish patriot and agrarian leader, Michael Davitt (1846-1906).

History
Ballyhegan Davitts was founded in 1902, which makes it one of the oldest clubs in Armagh.

Football
The Senior team featured in the first-ever Armagh Intermediate Football Championship final, in 1964, losing by a goal to Madden. The Davitts have since won the IFC twice, in 1975 (beating Oliver Plunkett's 0-13 to 0-06) and 1997 (beating Collegeland 1-09 to 1-08).

In 2010, the club's Minor team won the Armagh Division 3 County Championship, becoming the club's first ever under-age All-County Champions.

Honours

Notable players
 Paul McGrane, All-Ireland winner with Armagh in 2002

Ladies' Gaelic football
Ballyhegan Senior Ladies compete in the Armagh Senior League and Intermediate Championship.

Culture
The club offers Irish language classes for all ages.

Facilities
The clubrooms host a wide variety of community events.

References

External links
 Ballyhegan GAC website
 Ballyhegan on Armagh GAA website

Gaelic games clubs in County Armagh
Gaelic football clubs in County Armagh